The following is a list of the 60 municipalities (comuni) of the Province of Lodi, Lombardy, Italy.

List

References

Lodi